Huai'an railway station is a railway station of Zhangjiakou–Hohhot high-speed railway and Datong–Zhangjiakou high-speed railway located in Chaigoubu town, Huai'an County, Zhangjiakou, Hebei, China, opening on December 30, 2019.

There are 2 platforms and 6 tracks in this station. There is also a square in front of the station.

Notes

References

Stations on the Zhangjiakou–Hohhot high-speed railway
Stations on the Datong–Zhangjiakou High-speed Railway
Railway stations in Hebei
Railway stations in China opened in 2019